Nadson can refer to:

Alexander Nadson (1926–2015), Apostolic Visitor for the Belarusian Greek Catholic Church
Georgii Nadson (1867–1939), Soviet biologist
Semyon Nadson (1862–1887), Russian poet
Nádson (footballer, born 1982), full name Nádson Rodrigues de Souza, Brazilian footballer
Nadson (footballer, born 1984), full name José Nadson Ferreira, Brazilian footballer
Nádson (footballer, born 1989), full name Nádson da Silva Almeida, Brazilian footballer
Nádson (footballer, born 1992), full name Nádson Alves Viana, Brazilian footballer